Amy Frazier was the defending champion, but did not compete this year.

Lindsay Davenport won the title by defeating Nicole Provis 6–1, 4–6, 6–2 in the final.

Seeds
The first four seeds receive a bye into the second round.

Draw

Finals

Top half

Bottom half

References

External links
 Official results archive (ITF)
 Official results archive (WTA)

WTA Swiss Open
European Open - Singles